Coupland is a small village in Cumbria, England, in the civil parish of Warcop. It is situated a short distance to the south-east of Appleby-in-Westmorland, just to the north of the A66, and lies within the historic county boundaries of Westmorland.

The name 'coupland' may be a corruption of the surname coupman (cf. Kaupmann)

Geography

Coupland Beck is a minor river that flows into the river Eden south of Coupland. Hilton Beck merges with Coupland Beck at the village of Coupland.

Coupland Beck Viaduct (also called Hilton Beck Viaduct) is a five arched, single track railway viaduct that carried the Eden Valley Railway over the stream.

See also

Listed buildings in Murton, Cumbria

References

Villages in Cumbria
Eden District